The Terrorist Offenders (Restriction of Early Release) Act 2020 (c. 3) is an act of the Parliament of the United Kingdom that makes legal provision for ending the practice of releasing individuals convicted of terrorism offences from prison after they have served half of their custodial sentence. The original bill was introduced on 11 February 2020, a week after the Streatham stabbing in south London, the perpetrator of which had been released from prison ten days before the incident. The legislation applies to those convicted of terrorism offences in England, Scotland and Wales. On 12 February the Bill cleared all of the stages required for it to pass through the House of Commons, doing so without the need for a vote. On 26 February the act received assent and went into effect, immediately preventing the automatic release of 50 convicted terrorists.

On 12 February, former Prime Minister Theresa May voiced concerns about the rehabilitation of such offenders, saying that although the government is "right" to address the early release issue, "terrorist offenders will still be released at some point. That is why the issue of rehabilitation, the work that is done both in prison and when they are out of prison is so important".

References

2020 in British law
2020 in British politics
Terrorism laws in the United Kingdom
Emergency laws in the United Kingdom
National security policies
Home Office (United Kingdom)
Counterterrorism in the United Kingdom
United Kingdom Acts of Parliament 2020